This Time It's Personal is a covers album by the English performance poet John Cooper Clarke, and the former vocalist and guitarist of the Stranglers, Hugh Cornwell. It was released on 14 October 2016 by Sony. The album features songs that were important to Clarke and Cornwell in their youth, and includes tracks by artists and songwriters such as Ricky Nelson, Ritchie Valens, Conway Twitty, Lieber and Stoller and Jimmy Webb. This Time It's Personal marks Clarke's singing debut on an album. It was Clarke's first album release since 1982's Zip Style Method.

Background
The album was conceived by Cornwell, when drunk and listening to "MacArthur Park", he wondered what the song would sound like if Clarke had sung it. Having spent dinner with Clarke weeks before, he rang him up and asked him if he was interested. Clarke was receptive to the idea, and after covering "MacArthur Park", the two decided to make an album of songs from their youth, with Clarke on vocals and Cornwell on guitars. "This is the music Hugh and I listened to at a similar age, the music we heard on radio growing up," Clarke said in 2017. "Not everyone had a record player, so radio was much more important then and we wanted to capture that."

To support the album's release, the duo undertook a small UK tour during November and December 2016.

Critical reception

The Arts Desk called the album "great 20th-century pop at its shortest, sweetest, and lingering best ... Warm, rich and full of heart." Clarke's delivery, they felt, "works perfectly against the skeletal, echoey guitars of Cornwell," adding, "there's a sense of austere clarity and simplicity, as opposed to indulgence or nostalgia." The Music wrote, "Doctor's unashamedly Manchester nasal tones, which can be surprisingly melodic at times, are delivered against Cornwall's dense guitar noise. The results can be almost bebop jazz – or karaoke night at The Salford Workers Club. The kind-of-sweet ("It's Only Make Believe") collides with the dryly comical ("Love Potion No 9"). Then there's a sprawling ramble at "MacArthur Park", which is either towering genius or towering folly – but, like the whole project, probably somewhere between the two."

The Louder Than War website called it "a modern masterpiece" and "one of the more remarkable albums in recent history." They felt that the album shows "an impressive ability" to assemble these songs and "mastermind an album of modern interpretations." Cornwell's production skills, they wrote, "demonstrate a rare talent and are all the more impressive for the challenge of the project." Louder Than War said of Clarke's vocal performance: "He brings sensitivity and affection for the songs he is singing, and his distinctive vocals ... add the vital touch of originality ... the fact that [the songs] are well-known means it is not so easy to take liberties with them, but the tracks chosen are respectfully, even lovingly, delivered and this is clearly a labour of love for both men."

Track listing

Personnel 

 Dr John Cooper Clarke – vocals
 Hugh Cornwell – guitar, drum programming, backing vocals (track 7)
Additional musicians

 Phil Andrews – keyboards, programming, drum programming, accordion (track 10)
 Ian Anderson – flute (track 5)
 Lettie Maclean – backing vocals (track 4)
 Ben Waghorn  – saxophone (tracks 1, 2)
 Hilary Kops – trumpet (tracks 2, 3)

Technical
 Hugh Cornwell – producer, mixing
 Phil Andrews – engineer, mixing
 Scott Minshall – design
 Donal Whelan – mastering
 Dean Chalkley – photography
 Joanna Kalli – project manager

References

External links

2016 albums
John Cooper Clarke albums
Hugh Cornwell albums
Covers albums
Sony Music albums